Events from the year 1830 in China.

Incumbents
 Daoguang Emperor (10th year)

Establishments 
 Lukang Ai Gate

Births 

 Hu Jiumei
 Su Sanniang
 Pan Zuyin

Deaths 

Li Ruzhen, Chinese novelist and phonologist

References